WPCH (1310 AM) is a radio station broadcasting a sports format. Licensed to West Point, Georgia, United States, the station is currently owned by San Antonio–based iHeartMedia, through licensee iHM Licenses, LLC, and features programming from Fox Sports Radio.

History
The station signed on in August 1958 as WBMK. It changed its call letters to WZZZ on December 1, 1976, and was assigned the call sign WPLV on January 1, 1988. On October 7, 1994, the station changed its call sign to WCJM, then on February 23, 1996, switched back to WPLV.

In March 2003, Root Communications License Company, L.P., reached an agreement to sell this station to Qantum Communications subsidiary Qantum of Auburn License Company, LLC, as part of a 26 station deal valued at $82.2 million.  The deal was approved by the FCC on April 30, 2003, and the transaction was consummated on July 2, 2003.

On May 15, 2014, Qantum Communications announced that it would sell its 29 stations, including WPLV, to Clear Channel Communications (now iHeartMedia), in a transaction connected to Clear Channel's sale of WALK AM-FM in Patchogue, New York, to Connoisseur Media via Qantum. The transaction was consummated on September 9, 2014.

The station took on the WPCH call sign on June 1, 2015.

Programming
All of the programming on WPCH is from Fox Sports Radio.

References

External links

PCH
Sports radio stations in the United States
Radio stations established in 1958
IHeartMedia radio stations
1958 establishments in Georgia (U.S. state)
Fox Sports Radio stations